The Sackville Street Building is a building on Sackville Street in Manchester, England. The University of Manchester occupies the building which, before the merger with UMIST in 2004, was UMIST's "Main Building". Construction of the building for the Manchester School of Technology began in 1895 on a site formerly occupied by Sir Joseph Whitworth's engineering works; it was opened in 1902 by the then Prime Minister, Arthur Balfour. The School of Technology became the Manchester Municipal College of Technology in 1918.

Built using Burmantofts terracotta, it was subsequently extended along Whitworth Street, towards London Road, between 1927 and 1957 by the architects Bradshaw Gass & Hope, the delay being due to the depression in the 1930s and the Second World War. Originally, a swimming pool was planned for the top floor, but after concerns that the weight of water might cause structural issues, it was instead used as a dug in gymnasium and in more recent years as an examination hall. The building was Grade II listed in 1974.

The building is bounded by Whitworth Street to the north, Granby Row to the south, Cobourg Street to the east, and Sackville Street to the west, where the original main entrance (called the Grand Entrance) lies. The entrance on Granby Row is the usual entrance to the eastern part of the building (there is another entrance on Whitworth Street only for the use of the students and staff of the University of Manchester).  The lower floors contain among other departments the Royce Laboratory for mechanical engineering, named after Henry Royce. Floors are denoted by letters, from BA (lowest), then A to L (highest) missing out I. The historic Godlee Observatory sits on the roof and is still in use. The building is used by the University for a number of functions and departments. These include administration, teaching and research in science and technology, and examinations.

Inside on floors D, E and F are the Joule Library (now part of the University of Manchester Library) and various offices, laboratories, lecture theatres and exam halls. The Joule Library was given this name (commemorating the physicist J. P. Joule) in 1987 when it was refurbished.

There are inscriptions at the Grand Entrance and at the Whitworth Street entrance, recording important events in the history of the building. The later part of the building was built on the site of St Augustine's Church, the third Roman Catholic chapel in Manchester. It was replaced by the second St Augustine's Church in York Street, Chorlton on Medlock. There is also a plaque recording the previous existence of Ivan Levinstein's laboratory on the site.

In the estates strategy for 2010-2020 for the University of Manchester, it is stated that essentially all of the former UMIST campus, described as the "area north of the Mancunian Way", is to be disposed of. The fate of the former UMIST Main Building (Sackville Street Building) is not described. The vice-chancellor of Manchester University, Dame Nancy Rothwell, has stated that a fitting use must be found for this "fine old building".

Sackville Street Building currently serves as the home for the University of Manchester's school of Electrical and Electronic Engineering (EEE), along with providing a base for textile sciences and nuclear science at the Dalton Institute on site.

See also

Listed buildings in Manchester-M1

References

UMIST Joule Library. Manchester: the University of Manchester Institute of Science & Technology, 1987

Further reading
"The new Municipal Technical School"; The Journal of the Manchester Geographical Society; vol. XVI (1900), pp. 293-95 (an article contributed to the Evening Mail based on the remarks of Alderman Hoy and Mr. J. H. Reynolds when the society visited the school, 7 July 1900)

Buildings at the University of Manchester
Towers in Greater Manchester
School buildings completed in 1902
1902 establishments in England
Grade II listed buildings in Manchester
Grade II listed educational buildings
Bradshaw, Gass & Hope buildings
Brick buildings and structures
Renaissance Revival architecture in England